Enchanted Garden is a Philippine fantasy-drama TV series aired on TV5. It was aired during weekdays at 6:30 pm (UTC+8) and it had a weekly marathon during Sundays at 10:30 am with no commercial breaks.

Plot
Enchanted Garden is set against the entrancing garden world of Eden, parallel to the land of mortals where Queen Jasmina and her daughters Alvera, Valeriana and Quassia live. Alvera, Valerianna and Quassia are Diwanis — the appointed guardians of all plants and trees. Jealousy separates the sisters as Valerianna discovers Menandro's love for her sister Alvera. Menandro and Alvera's love brings forth a child, Aya, who grows up in the mortal world.

Cast

The Garden of Eden

World of Mortals

Special participation

Extended cast

Cameo appearance
Angeli Nicole Sanoy as young Aya
Francheska Salcedo as young Gigi

Special participation
Luz Fernandez
Junnyka Santarin

Monarchs of Eden
Queen Oleya
Played by Nora Aunor
She is the first known queen of Eden. When Saulo and Jasmina punished Helvora by the use of the Shrine of Justice, she made a sanctuary on the world of mortals and renamed herself as Nana Sela. This is for refuge to Helvora's vengeance. Saulo and Jasmina didn't believe her but dethroned her.

Queen Jasmina
Played by Marita Zobel
She became the second queen next to Queen Oleya. Her early years as a queen proved how good she is. Her deeds gave a fruitful Eden and Nature. She had three daughters; Diwani Alvera, Diwani Valeriana and Diwani Quassia. She became ill because of Menandro's greed over her power. She died because of saving the mortal world from Valeriana's evil attacks.

Queen Alvera
Played by Alice Dixson
She ascended to the throne because her mother became ill. She is the 3rd known queen of Eden. Her short span of serving Eden as the queen was sabotaged by her sister Valeriana. She was dethroned because of giving birth to the fruit of the evil Menandro which is diwani Olivia.

Queen Valeriana
Played by Ruffa Gutierrez
The 4th and 7th known queen of Eden. She replaced Alvera as the next queen. She is the start of Helvora's vengeance. She ruled for several years serving Helvora and finding Olivia for Menandro to escape from the shrine's punishment. When the Diwani's Alvera, Quassia and Olivia together Michiko caught her in a fight they removed Helvora's evil presence to her. She was reinstated to the throne after Queen Olivia's decision of giving her the throne.

Queen Michiko
Played by BB Gandanghari
She is 5th and the next queen after Valeriana. The throne should be given to Olivia after removing the evil presence of Helvora to Valeriana. Unknown to the Diwanis, Michiko is one of Helvora's fruit that used Aya for entering the portal to Eden. She kills Olivia in a fight for the throne to have the opportunity to be the next queen.

Queen Olivia
Played by Alex Gonzaga
The 6th known queen of Eden. She became Queen after Michiko was defeated. Queen Oleya named her the next Queen of Eden before she succumbed to her wounds. She ruled for a short time before relinquishing her throne to Diwani Valeriana after realizing who she truly loves.

Queen Helfora
Played by Bing Loyzaga
The 8th queen who  took the throne from Valeriana and crowned herself as the new queen. Helvora is the root of wickedness in Eden. She ruled in vengeance and evilness.

Eden terminologies
Diwani
A, Queen Jasmina. This title can be passed by the Diwani mother to her daughter. Olivia / Aya, Diwani Alvera's daughter is also entitled a Diwani.

Eden
A land of the new beings where the Edenians and Edentors live.
 
Edentor
A term for an Eden warrior or a male Eden creature.

Edenian
A term for female Eden creature.

 Venga 
An evil tree and servant of Helfora located secretly at the end-forest of Eden. It has black powers and was once used by Diwani Valeriana to own the heart and love of Menandro. The evil tree was a servant of Helvora who was once an Eden creature and guardian, punished by the council elders of Eden because of greed of power over the world of Eden. He was later killed by Helfora, thus regretting serving her. He told Bonsai about the whereabouts of the salangkays, the first one in the Servera, while the second in Hades.

 Kartun 
Also an evil tree and servant of Helvora. After Helvora ruled Eden, Kartun took the memory of Diwani Quassia, Kamagong, and Molave. He also took the being of Paco, making him a monster,

Helfora
The evil tree who opposes the good leadership to Eden of Queen Oleya. She is the mother of Bakun and Menandro.

Viña
A strand of hair made of vine that indicates a Diwani or a royal blooded Eden guardian.

Nima
An Eden word for niece.

Bundok ng Kaparis
A Mountain wherein Ella raised her wand and the Ice all over Eden melted

Duranggol
Evil creatures That appeared during the Ice Season of Eden. They ate many Edenians as well as Edentors.

Dambana ng Katarungan (Shrine of Justice)
A powerful shrine that gives justice to crimes of Eden guardians.

Salangkay (Wand) 
A magic wand made of a tree-branch, holds the powers of sun, water and earth. Queen Jasmina's salangkay holds all of the environmental powers while her daughters has each of the three. Ella's salangkay was given to her by Olivia.

Dama
A term for the queen's maid.

Dragona
A creature that is made from fire formed into a human form. Kampupot and Santana are dragonas.

Tulay ng Katotohanan (Bridge of Truth)
A Bridge where the flowers tell the secrets who ever walk there.

Inang Kalikasan
The One Who Create Eden and help the Edenians and Edentors.

Hades
A place where Helfora hide the salangkay of Diwani Quassia and it's guarded by Santana.

Serbera
An evil place where Molave, Garita, Ella, Paco, and Diwani Quassia went to go to the Kingdom of Eden. Helfora also put the salangkay of Diwani Alvera in Servera. The Tulay ng Katotohanan can be found there.

Amborllia
The Amborillia is the moon in Eden.

International broadcast
 Cambodia - It was broadcast under the title "មន្តស្នេហ៍ឧទ្យានទេព" (mont sne utyean tep) on Hang Meas HDTV.

See also
List of programs broadcast by TV5 (Philippines)
List of programs aired by TV5 (Philippines)

References

External links

TV5 (Philippine TV network) drama series
2012 Philippine television series debuts
2013 Philippine television series endings
Philippine drama television series
Fantaserye and telefantasya
Filipino-language television shows